Nathanael Ogbeta (born 28 April 2001) is an English professional footballer who plays as a full back for EFL League One side Peterborough United, on loan from  club Swansea City.

Early and personal life
Ogbeta was born in Salford, Greater Manchester. His sister Naomi is an athlete. He is a devout Christian.

Career
Ogbeta joined Manchester City at the age of ten. He made his debut for the Manchester City U18 team during the 2018–19 season in a 4–2 win over Reading. During the 2019–20 season, Ogbeta made two appearances for the Manchester City U21s in the EFL Trophy in games against Scunthorpe United and Tranmere Rovers.

On 25 January 2021, Ogbeta signed for League One side Shrewsbury Town on an 18-month deal. He made his debut for The Shrews on 30 January, starting in a 2–0 win at home to Peterborough United.

On 31 January 2022, Ogbeta joined EFL Championship side Swansea City on a two-and-a-half year contract, for an undisclosed fee. After getting limited game time in Wales, on 13 January 2023 the player joined League One side Peterborough United on loan until the end of the season.

International career
Born in England, Ogbeta is of Nigerian and Jamaican descent. He is a youth international for England.

On 29 March 2022, Ogbeta made his England U20 debut in a 3-1 victory over Germany in Colchester.

Career statistics

References

2001 births
People from Salford
Living people
English footballers
England youth international footballers
English sportspeople of Nigerian descent
English sportspeople of Jamaican descent
Manchester City F.C. players
Shrewsbury Town F.C. players
Swansea City A.F.C. players
Peterborough United F.C. players
English Football League players
Association football defenders